Esther Utjiua Muinjangue (born 17 August 1962) is a Namibian politician and the president of the National Unity Democratic Organisation (NUDO), a party which occupies two seats in the National Assembly of Namibia and one seat in the National Council of Namibia. In addition,She is the first woman to lead a political party in Namibia, and the country's first female presidential candidate. She was appointed as the country's deputy minister of health and social services in March 2020 by Namibian president Hage Geingob. She has for a long time been advocating for social workers’ role in many aspects of people’s lives and at different levels.

Education 
Muinjangue is a social worker by profession and obtained her BA qualification from Academy of Tertiary Education (now University of Namibia)

She further obtained her Masters in Social Work at the University of Pretoria.

In December 2019, Esther Muinjangue obtained her PhD from the Stellenbosch University in South Africa. Esther was congratulated by her party people (NUDO) for obtaining her PhD.

Professional Career 
Muinjangue joined the public sector in 1987 as social worker, and in 1996, she became a social work lecturer at the University of Namibia.

Political Career 
The National Unity Democratic Organisation (NUDO) elected Muinjangue as its President –making her the first woman leader of a political party in Namibia.

2019 Presidential election
In the 2019 Namibian general election, Muinjangue ran as a presidential candidate, but only won 1.5% of the popular vote. However, NUDO won two seats in Parliament, so, as the leader of her party, she will sit in the National Assembly.

References

Living people
Members of the National Assembly (Namibia)
Women members of the National Assembly (Namibia)
National Unity Democratic Organisation politicians
Candidates for President of Namibia
1962 births